Palmwoods railway station is located on the North Coast line in Queensland, Australia. It serves the town of Palmwoods in the Sunshine Coast Region.

History
Palmwoods station opened in 1891. The station today consists of one platform with a wooden structure. In 2009, the platform was extended at both its northern and southern ends with scaffolding and plywood materials. Initially intended as an interim arrangement until a permanent extension was built, the temporary platform remains.

Palmwoods has two passing loops on its western side, with one disused, as well as another that runs behind the platform on its eastern side.

Services
Palmwoods is serviced by City network services to Brisbane, Nambour and Gympie North. To relieve congestion on the single track North Coast line, the rail service is supplemented by a bus service operated by Kangaroo Bus Lines on weekdays between Caboolture and Nambour as route 649.

Services by platform

Bus Service
Sunbus operates one bus route that services Palmwoods station:
 638- Nambour via Woombye
Kangaroo Bus Lines also operates one bus route that services Palmwoods station:
649- Caboolture

See also
 List of tramways in Queensland

References

External links

Palmwoods station Queensland Rail
Palmwoods station Queensland's Railways on the Internet

North Coast railway line, Queensland
Railway stations in Sunshine Coast, Queensland
Railway stations in Australia opened in 1891